State Line Slough may refer to:

State Line Slough (Missouri), in Atchison County, Missouri
State Line Slough (Iowa), in Clayton County, Iowa